The Fredonia Cumberland Presbyterian Church, in Fredonia, Kentucky, also known as Unity Missionary Baptist Church is a historic church on U.S. Highway 641.  It was built in 1892 and added to the National Register of Historic Places in 1985.

It is described as "a straightforward, well-executed version of Victorian Gothic architecture used in the construction of many Protestant churches in Kentucky during the late 19th century."

It is a cruciform-plan church which has a square bell tower.  It originally had a cupola, but that was destroyed by lightning in 1925 and was not replaced.

References

See also
National Register of Historic Places listings in Kentucky

Former Presbyterian churches in the United States
Presbyterian churches in Kentucky
Baptist churches in Kentucky
Churches on the National Register of Historic Places in Kentucky
Gothic Revival church buildings in Kentucky
Churches completed in 1892
19th-century Presbyterian church buildings in the United States
National Register of Historic Places in Caldwell County, Kentucky
Cumberland Presbyterian Church
1892 establishments in Kentucky